Josef "Pepo" Puch (born 10 January 1966 in Graz) is an Austrian-Croatian equestrian. He started in equestrian at fifteen.

Puch competed at the 2004 Summer Olympics for Croatia in the individual eventing with horse Banville D'Ivoy. He finished 63rd.

In 2008, Puch was in an accident and has incomplete paraplegia as a result. At the 2012 Summer Paralympics he won a gold medal and a bronze medal, this time competing for his birth country of Austria.
At the 2016 Summer Paralympics he also won a gold medal in the individual championship test and a silver medal in the individual freestyle test grade 1b.

References

External links 
Video Interview with Pepo Puch
Official homepage of Pepo Puch

Equestrians at the 2004 Summer Olympics
Equestrians at the 2012 Summer Paralympics
Austrian male equestrians
Croatian male equestrians
Paralympic gold medalists for Austria
Paralympic bronze medalists for Austria
Sportspeople from Graz
1966 births
Paralympic equestrians of Austria
Olympic equestrians of Croatia
Living people
Medalists at the 2012 Summer Paralympics
Paralympic medalists in equestrian
Medalists at the 2020 Summer Paralympics
Equestrians at the 2020 Summer Paralympics